Sir Thomas Fleming (1572 – 19 February 1624) was an English landowner and politician who sat in the House of Commons at various times between  1601 and 1622.

Fleming was the son of Sir Thomas Fleming and his wife Mary James, the daughter of Dr Mark James. He was educated at Emmanuel College, Cambridge in 1586 and at  Lincoln's Inn in 1590.

From about 1583 he was a J.P. for Hampshire and became a burgess of Southampton in 1599. In 1601, he was elected Member of Parliament for Winchester.  When his father was made a judge in 1604, he replaced him as MP for Southampton and was knighted in 1605. He succeeded the estates of his father in 1613. In 1614 and 1621 he was re-elected MP for Southampton.

Fleming died at the age of about 52 and was buried at Stoneham near his mother, father and wife.

Fleming had married Dorothy, daughter of Sir Henry Cromwell of Hinchingbrooke, Huntingdonshire in about 1605. They had three sons and four daughters.

Arms

References

1572 births
1624 deaths
Alumni of Emmanuel College, Cambridge
Members of Lincoln's Inn
English MPs 1601
English MPs 1604–1611
English MPs 1614
English MPs 1621–1622
People from North Stoneham